Jeffrey Jacob Abrams (born June 27, 1966) is an American filmmaker and composer. He is best known for his works in the genres of action, drama, and science fiction. Abrams wrote and produced such films as Regarding Henry (1991), Forever Young (1992), Armageddon (1998), Cloverfield (2008), Star Trek (2009), Star Wars: The Force Awakens (2015), and Star Wars: The Rise of Skywalker (2019).

Abrams has created numerous television series, including Felicity (co-creator, 1998–2002), Alias (creator, 2001–2006), Lost (co-creator, 2004–2010), and Fringe (co-creator, 2008–2013). He won two Emmy Awards for Lost – Outstanding Directing for a Drama Series and Outstanding Drama Series.

His directorial film work includes Mission: Impossible III (2006), Star Trek (2009), Super 8 (2011), and Star Trek Into Darkness (2013). He also directed, produced and co-wrote The Force Awakens, the seventh episode of the Star Wars saga and the first film of the sequel trilogy. The film is his highest-grossing, as well as the fifth-highest-grossing film of all time not adjusted for inflation. He returned to Star Wars by executive producing The Last Jedi (2017), and directing and co-writing The Rise of Skywalker (2019).

Abrams's frequent collaborators include producer Bryan Burk, producer/director, Damon Lindelof, producer/director, Tommy Gormley, actors Greg Grunberg, Simon Pegg, Amanda Foreman, and Keri Russell, composer Michael Giacchino, writers Alex Kurtzman and Roberto Orci, cinematographers Daniel Mindel and Larry Fong, and editors Maryann Brandon and Mary Jo Markey.

Early life

Abrams was born in New York City with the name Jeffrey Jacob Abrams to veteran television producer Gerald W. Abrams (born 1939) 
of Polish-Jewish descent and Carol Ann Abrams (née Kelvin; 1942–2012) a Peabody Award winning television executive producer, as well as an author and law academic. His sister is screenwriter Tracy Rosen. His father working at CBS in Midtown Manhattan the year prior to Abrams' birth. By 1971 the family had relocated to Los Angeles. His mother worked as a real estate agent while Abrams and his sister were at school.

Abrams attended Palisades High School and after graduation, Abrams planned on going to art school rather than a traditional college, but eventually enrolled at Sarah Lawrence College, in Bronxville, New York.

Film career

Early career
Abrams' first job in the movie business was at age 16 when he wrote the music for Don Dohler's 1982 horror movie Nightbeast. During his senior year at college, he teamed with Jill Mazursky, the daughter of award-winning writer/director Paul Mazursky, to write a feature film treatment. Purchased by Touchstone Pictures, the treatment was the basis for Taking Care of Business, Abrams' first produced film, which starred Charles Grodin and James Belushi and was directed by Academy Award winner Arthur Hiller. He followed with Regarding Henry, starring Harrison Ford, and Forever Young, starring Mel Gibson. He also co-wrote with Mazursky the script for the comedy Gone Fishin' starring Joe Pesci and Danny Glover.

In 1994, he was part of the "Propellerheads" with Rob Letterman, Loren Soman, and Andy Waisler, a group of Sarah Lawrence alums experimenting with computer animation technology. They were contracted by Jeffrey Katzenberg to develop animation for the film Shrek.  Abrams worked on the screenplay for the 1998 film Armageddon with producer Jerry Bruckheimer and director Michael Bay. That same year, he made his first foray into television with Felicity, which ran for four seasons on The WB Network, serving as the series' co-creator (with Matt Reeves) and executive producer. He also composed its opening theme music.

2000s

Under his production company, Bad Robot, which he founded with Bryan Burk in 2001, Abrams created and executive-produced ABC's Alias and is co-creator (along with Damon Lindelof and Jeffrey Lieber) and was executive producer of Lost. As with Felicity, Abrams also composed the opening theme music for Alias and Lost. Abrams directed and wrote the two-part pilot for Lost and remained active producer for the first half of the season. Also in 2001, Abrams co-wrote and produced the horror-thriller Joy Ride. In 2006, he served as executive producer of What About Brian and Six Degrees, also on ABC. He also co-wrote the teleplay for Losts third-season premiere "A Tale of Two Cities" and the same year, he made his feature directorial debut with Mission: Impossible III, starring Tom Cruise. Abrams spoke at the TED conference in 2007.

In 2008, Abrams produced the monster movie Cloverfield, which Matt Reeves directed. In 2009, he directed the science fiction film Star Trek, which he produced with Lost co-creator Damon Lindelof. While it was speculated that they would be writing and producing an adaptation of Stephen King's The Dark Tower series of novels, they publicly stated in November 2009 that they were no longer looking to take on that project. In 2008, Abrams co-created, executive produced, and co-wrote (along with Roberto Orci and Alex Kurtzman) the FOX science fiction series Fringe, for which he also composed the theme music. He was featured in the 2009 MTV Movie Awards 1980s-style digital short "Cool Guys Don't Look at Explosions", with Andy Samberg and Will Ferrell, in which he plays a keyboard solo. NBC picked up Abrams's Undercovers as its first new drama series for the 2010–11 season. However, it was subsequently cancelled by the network in November 2010.

2010s
Abrams wrote and directed the Paramount science fiction thriller Super 8, starring Joel Courtney and Elle Fanning, while co-producing with Steven Spielberg and Bryan Burk; it was released on June 10, 2011.

Abrams directed the sequel to Star Trek, Star Trek Into Darkness, released in May 2013. The film was interpreted as a loose remake of Star Trek II: The Wrath of Khan. Critics generally reacted positively to the film, while Nicholas Meyer, the director of The Wrath of Khan, called it a "gimmick". Abrams was criticized for the film's treatment of classic villain Khan Noonien Singh (Benedict Cumberbatch). Many felt that much of the character, originally played by Mexican actor Ricardo Montalbán, had been lost, especially his ethnic identity. Two years after the film's release, Abrams said of the film, "there were certain things I was unsure of. ... Any movie ... has a fundamental conversation happening during it. And [for Into Darkness,] I didn't have it... [The weakness of the plot] was not anyone's fault but mine. ... [The script] was a little bit of a collection of scenes that were written by my friends ... And yet, I found myself frustrated by my choices, and unable to hang my hat on an undeniable thread of the main story. So then I found myself on that movie basically tap-dancing as well as I could to try and make the sequences as entertaining as possible. ... I would never say that I don't think that the movie ended up working. But I feel like it didn't work as well as it could have, had I made some better decisions before we started shooting."

On January 25, 2013, Disney and Lucasfilm introduced Abrams as director and producer of Star Wars: The Force Awakens, the seventh entry in the Star Wars film saga, with Bryan Burk and Bad Robot Productions producing the film. Following this news, speculation arose as to Abrams's future with Paramount Pictures, under which he had released all of his previous feature work as a director, and which had a first-look deal with his company, Bad Robot Productions. Paramount vice-chairman Rob Moore stated that Abrams would continue to have a hand in the Star Trek and Mission: Impossible franchises going forward.

Abrams directed, produced, and co-wrote the screenplay for The Force Awakens, which opened in theaters on December 18, 2015. Despite its strong box office performance and positive reviews, the film was considered by some, including Star Wars creator George Lucas, to be too similar to the original 1977 film. In 2016, Abrams responded towards these complaints, stating: "What was important for me was introducing brand new characters using relationships that were embracing the history that we know to tell a story that is new — to go backwards to go forwards".

Abrams returned as producer for Star Trek Beyond, released in 2016. And also produced The Cloverfield Paradox, a sequel to 10 Cloverfield Lane. It was released on Netflix in February 2018. Also on 2018, Abrams produced Overlord, a horror film set behind German enemy lines in World War II and directed by Julius Avery. Abrams also produced the fourth, fifth, and sixth Mission: Impossible films.

In September 2017, Abrams returned to direct and co-write Star Wars: The Rise of Skywalker with Chris Terrio. The film was released in December 2019; it received mixed reviews from critics and fans, while audience reactions leaned more positively.

Abrams was one of the producers of an animated short film of The Boy, the Mole, the Fox and the Horse, shown on BBC One and BBC iPlayer at Christmas 2022.

Upcoming projects
In 2008, it was reported that Abrams purchased the rights to a New York Times article "Mystery on Fifth Avenue" about the renovation of an 8.5 million dollar co-op, a division of property originally owned by E. F. Hutton & Co. and Marjorie Merriweather Post, for six figures and was developing a film titled Mystery on Fifth Avenue, with Paramount Pictures and Bad Robot Productions, and comedy writers Maya Forbes and Wally Wolodarsky to write the adaptation. According to the article, a wealthy couple Steven B. Klinsky and Maureen Sherry purchased the apartment in 2003 and live there with their four children. Soon after purchasing the apartment, they hired young architectural designer Eric Clough, who devised an elaborately clever "scavenger hunt" built into the apartment that involved dozens of historical figures, a fictional book and a soundtrack, woven throughout the apartment in puzzles, riddles, secret panels, compartments, and hidden codes, without the couple's knowledge. The family didn't discover the embedded mystery until months after moving into the apartment. After Abrams purchased the article, Clough left him an encrypted message in the wall tiles of a Christian Louboutin shoe store he designed in West Hollywood.

In July 2016, Abrams reported that a fourth alternate universe Star Trek installment was in the works and that he was confident that Chris Pine, Zachary Quinto and Chris Hemsworth would return for the sequel.

In May 2018, Abrams and Avery had reunited to produce and direct, respectively, a superhero thriller film titled The Heavy, with a script written by Daniel Casey. Paramount and Bad Robot plan to begin filming sometime in 2018.

Abrams will produce and Guillermo del Toro will write and direct a science-fiction action/thriller film titled Zanbato, which Abrams has been working on since 2011.

In September 2019, Abrams and his Bad Robot Productions company signed a $250 million five-year deal with WarnerMedia, including HBO and Warner Bros. Pictures. In April 2020, it was announced that Abrams would be developing three new shows for HBO Max: Justice League Dark, Overlook, and Duster. Abrams will also serve as executive producer and co-creator of a new Batman animated series titled Batman: Caped Crusader alongside Reeves and Bruce Timm. In February 2022, it was announced Abrams would serve as executive producer on a limited series adaptation of the Stephen King novel Billy Summers, with Edward Zwick and Marshall Herskovitz writing; a year later, it was announced that Warner Bros. had acquired the project, which was now being repurposed as a feature film with Leonardo DiCaprio's Appian Way Productions joining as a producer.

Unrealized projects 

In 1989, Abrams met Steven Spielberg at a film festival, where Spielberg spoke about a possible Who Framed Roger Rabbit sequel, with Abrams as a possible writer and with Robert Zemeckis as producer. Nothing came up from this project, although Abrams has some storyboards for a Roger Rabbit short.

In July 2002, Abrams wrote a script for a possible fifth Superman film entitled Superman: Flyby. Brett Ratner and McG entered into talks to direct, although Abrams tried to get the chance to direct his own script. However, the project was finally cancelled in 2004 and instead Superman Returns was released in 2006.

In November 2009, Abrams and Bad Robot Productions along with Cartoon Network Movies, Warner Bros., Frederator Films and Paramount Pictures, reportedly were producing a film adaptation of Samurai Jack. However, the production of the film was scrapped after Abrams' departure from the project to direct Star Trek. For this and other reasons, series creator Genndy Tartakovsky made a new season instead of a feature film. Also in 2009, Abrams and Bad Robot Productions were reportedly set to produce a film based on the Micronauts toy line. However, the film has never gone into production.

In February 2018, HBO ordered Abrams' sci-fi drama Demimonde to series. In June 2022, the project was cancelled.

Bad Robot

In 2001, Abrams founded his own production company Bad Robot Productions in association with Paramount Pictures and Warner Bros. Pictures. The company is well known for the Star Trek film reboot franchise, the Cloverfield franchise, and the Star Wars sequel trilogy. In early 2021, it was announced that Abrams and Bad Robot Productions will produce several films and television series based on members of the DC Comics superhero team Justice League Dark in similar fashion to how Marvel Comics released individual television series based on members of The Defenders until their team up miniseries Defenders. It was also announced Abrams would produce a reboot of the Superman movie franchise.

Other work

Video game
In November 2015, Abrams was developing a video game called Spyjinx, in a collaboration between Bad Robot Productions and Chair Entertainment.

Books and comics
On October 29, 2013, S., a novel written by Doug Dorst based on a concept by Abrams, was released.

In 2019, Abrams made his debut as a writer for Marvel Comics, co-authoring the company's title Spider-Man from September of that year with his son Henry. The first issue of the comic includes the death of Mary-Jane Watson, and a twelve-year time shift, with the series' protagonist being Ben Parker, son of Peter Parker and Mary Jane.

Personal life
Abrams is married to public relations executive Katie McGrath and has three children. His daughter, Gracie Abrams, is a pop singer-songwriter. He resides in Pacific Palisades, Los Angeles, California. He is Jewish and his wife is Catholic, and he sometimes takes his children to religious services on Jewish holidays.

Abrams serves on the Creative Council of Represent.Us, a nonpartisan anti-corruption organization and the Motion Picture & Television Fund (MPTF) Board of Governors.

Filmography

Film

Acting credits

Other roles

Television

Executive producer only
 What About Brian (2006–07)
 Six Degrees (2006–07)
 Believe (2014)
 11.22.63 (2016) (Miniseries)
 Roadies (2016)
 Westworld (2016–2022)
 Castle Rock (2018–19)
 Little Voice (2020)
 Lovecraft Country (2020)
 Challenger: The Final Flight (2020)
 Lisey's Story (2021) (Miniseries)
 UFO (2021)

Acting credits

Theatre

Bibliography 
 S. (with Doug Dorst, 2013)

Awards and nominations

See also
 Saturn Award for Best Director

Notes

References

Further reading

External links

 
 
 
 
 
 
 

 
1966 births
Action film directors
American male screenwriters
American people of Polish-Jewish descent
American people of Latvian-Jewish descent
American people of Latvian descent
American television composers
American television directors
Television producers from New York City
American television writers
Film directors from New York City
International Emmy Founders Award winners
Jewish American television composers
Jewish American screenwriters
Jewish American film directors
Jewish American film producers
Jewish American television producers
Living people
Male television composers
American male television writers
Primetime Emmy Award winners
Sarah Lawrence College alumni
Science fiction film directors
Showrunners
Television show creators
Writers from New York City
Writers Guild of America Award winners
Screenwriters from New York (state)